Chru is a Chamic language of Vietnam spoken by the Churu people in southern Lâm Đồng Province (especially in Đơn Dương District) and in Ninh Thuận Province.

Like the other Chamic languages spoken in Vietnam (Cham, Jarai, Rade and Roglai), use of Chru is declining as native speakers are generally bilingual in Vietnamese, which is used for most official or public settings, like schools.

Phonology

Consonant inventory
The following table lists the consonants of Chru.

{| class=wikitable style="text-align: center;"
! colspan="2" |
! Labial
! Apical
! Alveolo-palatal
! Velar
! Glottal
|-
! colspan="2" | Nasal
| 
| 
| 
| 
|
|-
! rowspan="2" | Plosive
! voiceless
| 
| 
| 
| 
|rowspan="2"| 
|-
! voiced
| 
| 
| 
| 
|-
! colspan="2" | Fricative
|
|
| 
|
| 
|-
! colspan="2" | Approximant
| 
|
| 
|
|
|}

For example, from the word  ('to plane') the nominal  ('a plane') can be derived by infixation of -n-.

Vowel inventory
The vowel inventory is given in the following table. All vowels but  exist in nasalized form.

{| class=wikitable style="text-align: center;"
!
! Front
! Central
! Back
|-
! High
| 
|
| 
|-
! Upper Mid
| 
| 
| 
|-
! Lower Mid
| 
|
| 
|-
! Low
| colspan="3" | 
|}

Phonotactics
Words consist of up to two pre-syllables, and a main syllable. The vowels in the pre-syllables are always  after a consonant and  otherwise.

Grammar

Syntax
Like many other languages of Southeast Asia, including Vietnamese, Chru is an analytic (or isolating) language without morphological marking of case, gender, number, or tense. In its typological profile it reflects extensive language contact effects, as it more closely resembles a Mon-Khmer language with monosyllabic roots and impoverished morphology rather than a canonical Austronesian language with bisyllabic roots and derivational morphology (Grant 2005). It has subject-verb-object (SVO) word order.

Negation
Chru uses a pre-verbal negative particle,   as a simple negative in declarative sentences:

An optional clause-final negative particle, may also be used, particularly in negative questions and negative responses to questions:

References

Chamic languages
Languages of Vietnam